The Superhumans Center is an orthopedic specialist clinic for the treatment and rehabilitation of war victims who are dependent on a prosthesis due to amputation.
The focus of the clinic is a personalized approach to body reconstruction, limb prothesis, skin transplantation, exoskeletons, powered by domestically manufactured state-of-the-art medical devices but also psychological support for patients.
It will operate several departments, including surgical, traumatological, physical, PTSD and a pediatric reconstruction department.

Superhumans Center will be built on the premises of the existing Yuriy Lipa Lviv Regional Hospital of war veterans and oppressed and the opening of the center is scheduled for April 2023.

The supervisory board of the clinic includes President's wife Olena Zelenska. Supporters include rock singer Sting, actor and director Liev Schreiber, the British Virgin Group, and various American charities operating under the U.S. Charities covered by 501(c)(3).

On November 5, 2022, Ukrainian singer-actor Andriy Danylko, also known by his stage name Verka Serduchka, auctioned off his 1974 Rolls-Royce, once owned by Freddie Mercury, through London auction house Sotheby's for £250,000 to deal with the sale of the car to the Superhumans Center to support.
The car, which was auctioned by Danylko in 2013 for £75,000, raised an additional £36,250 thanks to the sale house waiving the buyer's premium, raising a total of £286,250 (about €328,900) for the Superhumas Centre.

References

External links

 Official website

Hospitals in Ukraine